Stará Paka is a municipality and village in Jičín District in the Hradec Králové Region of the Czech Republic. It has about 2,100 inhabitants.

Administrative parts
Villages of Brdo, Karlov, Krsmol, Roškopov and Ústí are administrative parts of Stará Paka.

References

External links

Villages in Jičín District